fourth period may refer to:

 Overtime (ice hockey), the 1st overtime period, or 4th period of a game
 Period 4 elements of the chemical periodic table
 Fourth period under communist dogma, see Third Period

See also
 4th Period Mystery